Midgard is the ninth studio album by the German band Faun, released on 19 August 2016 via Electrola (Universal Music Group). It is the final album to feature Katja Moslehner before her departure in 2017.

Conception
Midgard is themed around Norse mythology. It also has elements from the Celtic-speaking area. The music takes inspiration from melodies from Sweden and Norway.

Reception
Ulf Kubanke of laut.de wrote positively about the songs "Odin" and "Rabenballade", but described the album overall as sterile and too simple. Matthias Weise of Metal.de wrote that the album contains both the pop-oriented side of Faun, with "Federkleid" as a positive example, and more atmospheric tracks reminiscent of the band's early works. Weise called "Odin" especially gripping due to its interplay between lyrics and music. He described "Gold und Seide", "Brandan" and "Lange Schatten" as weak. Overall he called Midgard a "strong and playful album with great lyrics, dreamy melodies and exciting song structures".

Midgard entered the German album chart on 26 August 2016 as number three, which became its peak position. This was the highest position any Faun album had reached; the previous record was held by Luna (2014) which peaked as number four. Midgard remained on the chart for 13 weeks.

Track listing

Personnel
Faun
 Oliver s. Tyr – vocals, harp, lute, nyckelharpa, bouzouki
 Fiona Frewert – vocals, flute, bagpipes, violin, chalumeau
 Rüdiger Maul – drums, percussion
 Niel Mitra – synthesizer, sampler, keyboards
 Stephan Groth – hurdy gurdy, zither, vocals
 Katja Moslehner – vocals

Guests
 Efren Lopez – lute on track 4, 5 and 8
 Maya Fridman – cello on track 5, 7, 13 and 15
 Einar Selvik – vocals, lyre, harp, percussion and bullroarer on track 10
 Martin Seeberg – violin on track 12

References

External links
 Album-Fact: Faun 'Midgard' (Tour Edition) from Universal Music Group 

2016 albums
Faun (band) albums
Universal Music Germany albums
Norse mythology in music